Hadena gueneei is a species of moth of the  family Noctuidae. It is found in Italy, the Balkans, Turkey, Israel, Transcaucasia, Iran and Turkmenistan.

Adults are on wing from May to August. There is one generation per year.

The larvae probably feed on capsules of Caryophyllaceae species.

Subspecies
Hadena gueneei gueneei
Hadena gueneei hostilis

External links
 Hadeninae of Israel

Hadena
Moths of Europe
Moths of Asia